This list lists achievements and distinctions of various presidential candidates. It does not include the accomplishments of vice presidential candidates nor distinctions achieved during presidencies, with the exception of those that directly relate to presidential elections. Records concerning party nominations go back to 1796, the first time that political parties nominated presidential tickets. Records concerning the national popular vote only go back to the 1824 election, when the national popular vote began to be officially recorded. Certain other records are noted as going back to the 1804 ratification of the Twelfth Amendment, which made significant alterations to the process of presidential elections.

1789
 First victorious candidate to have served in the Continental Army: George Washington
 First victorious candidate whose primary state of residence was in the Southern United States: George Washington

1796
 First presidential nominee of the Federalist Party, and first Federalist to win a presidential election: John Adams
 First major party candidate and first victorious candidate whose primary state of residence was in the Northeastern United States: John Adams
 First presidential nominee of the Democratic-Republican Party: Thomas Jefferson
 First recipient of a vote from a faithless elector: Thomas Jefferson

1800
 First individuals to serve as the presidential nominee of a major party in two elections: John Adams and Thomas Jefferson

1808
 First individual to win election during the presidency of another individual from the same party: James Madison

1812
 First major party candidate to have served in the United States Senate: DeWitt Clinton

1816 

 First sitting U.S. senator and first sitting member of Congress to serve as a major party candidate: Rufus King

1824
 First winning presidential candidate to not win a plurality of the national popular vote: John Quincy Adams
 First victorious candidate with a spouse born outside of North America: John Quincy Adams
 First losing presidential candidate to win a plurality of the national popular vote: Andrew Jackson

1828
 First nominee of the Democratic Party, and first Democrat to win a presidential election: Andrew Jackson
 First victorious candidate to have served in the United States Army after 1796: Andrew Jackson
 First nominee of the National Republican Party: John Quincy Adams

1832
 First individual nominated by a presidential nominating convention: William Wirt

1840
 First major party nominee and first victorious candidate whose primary state of residence was in the Midwestern United States: William Henry Harrison
 First presidential candidate to campaign with an official party platform: Martin Van Buren

1844
 First dark horse candidate to win a major party's presidential nomination: James K. Polk
 First sitting president to serve no more than one term and not win a major party's presidential nomination: John Tyler
 First sitting president to be nominated by a third party: John Tyler

1848
 First sitting president to serve no more than one term and decline to seek another term: James K. Polk
 First major party nominee and first victorious candidate who had never previously held elective office: Zachary Taylor
 First former president to run for president as a third party nominee: Martin Van Buren
 First third party candidate to win at least ten percent of the national popular vote: Martin Van Buren

1856
 First sitting, elected president to lose a bid for re-nomination: Franklin Pierce
 First major party candidate whose primary state of residence was in the Western United States: John C. Frémont
 First third party candidate to win at least twenty percent of the national popular vote: Millard Fillmore

1860
 First Republican to win a presidential election: Abraham Lincoln
 First victorious candidate born outside of the original thirteen states of the United States: Abraham Lincoln
 First major party candidates that resided in the same home state: Abraham Lincoln, Stephen A. Douglas
 First victorious major party nominee to win less than 40 percent of the national popular vote: Abraham Lincoln
 First third party candidate to finish second in the electoral vote: John C. Breckinridge
 First third party nominee to win at least ten percent of the national popular vote, but finish fourth in the national popular vote: John Bell

1864
 First individual from the Northern states to win two presidential elections: Abraham Lincoln

1872

 First woman to run for president: Victoria Woodhull
 First major party nominee to die before the official tallying of electoral votes: Horace Greeley

1876
 First losing presidential candidate to win a majority of the popular vote: Samuel J. Tilden

1880
 First individual to seek a third presidential term: Ulysses S. Grant

1884
 First former mayor to win a presidential election: Grover Cleveland

1892
 First individual to run on a major party ticket with three different running mates during their career: Grover Cleveland
 First individual to win two presidential elections without winning a majority of the national popular vote: Grover Cleveland

1904
 First individual to succeed to the presidency following the death or resignation of a predecessor, and then win election in his own right: Theodore Roosevelt
 First African American to run for president: George Edwin Taylor

1912
 First individual to win a presidential preference primary: Robert M. La Follette

1916
 First Supreme Court justice to win a major party's presidential nomination: Charles Evans Hughes

1928
 First Roman Catholic to be nominated for President of the United States by a major party: Al Smith
 First victorious candidate born west of the Mississippi River: Herbert Hoover
 First victorious candidate whose primary state of residence was in the Western United States: Herbert Hoover

1940
 First major party nominee who had never held elective office, served as a Cabinet secretary, or held the rank of general: Wendell Willkie

1944
 First major party nominee born in the 20th century: Thomas E. Dewey

1948
 First individual to run for president in six elections: Norman Thomas

1960
 First Roman Catholic to win a presidential election: John F. Kennedy
 First individual who had served in the United States Navy to win a presidential election: John F. Kennedy
 First African American to run for president in a major party primary: Frank R. Beckwith

1964
 First woman to seek a major party's presidential nomination: Margaret Chase Smith

1972
 First African-American woman to seek a major party's presidential nomination: Shirley Chisholm
 First woman to seek the Democratic Party's presidential nomination: Shirley Chisholm

1980
 First Latino American to seek a major party's presidential nomination: Ben Fernandez

1984
 First African-American man to seek a major party's presidential nomination: Jesse Jackson

1988
 First woman to appear on the general election ballot of all fifty states: Lenora Fulani
 First Greek American and Greek Orthodox to run for President: Michael Dukakis

1992
 First independent candidate to win at least ten percent of the national popular vote: Ross Perot

2008
 First African American major party presidential nominee and first African American to win a presidential election: Barack Obama
 First victorious presidential candidate born outside of the Contiguous United States: Barack Obama
 First major party presidential nominees born outside of the Contiguous United States: Barack Obama and John McCain
 First woman to serve as a vice presidential nominee for the Republican Party: Sarah Palin
 First Latino American to seek the Democratic Party's presidential nomination: Bill Richardson
 First former First Lady to run for president: Hillary Clinton

2012
 First member of LDS Church to serve as a major party presidential nominee: Mitt Romney
 First openly gay candidate for president: Fred Karger

2016
 First woman to serve as a major party's presidential nominee: Hillary Clinton
 First women to receive electoral votes for president: Hillary Clinton and Faith Spotted Eagle
 First woman to win the popular vote in a presidential election: Hillary Clinton
 First Jewish candidate to win a presidential primary contest: Bernie Sanders
 First Jewish candidate to receive electoral college votes for president: Bernie Sanders
 First Native American to receive electoral college votes for president: Faith Spotted Eagle
 First Latino American to win a presidential primary contest: Ted Cruz
 First Cuban American to win a presidential primary contest: Marco Rubio

2020
 First openly gay candidate to win a presidential primary contest: Pete Buttigieg
 First Hindu candidate to seek a major party's presidential nomination: Tulsi Gabbard

See also
 List of United States presidential firsts

Notes

References

Works cited

 
  Originally published as 
 
 
 
 
 
 
 
 
 
 
 
 Smith, Richard Norton. Thomas E. Dewey and His Times. Simon & Schuster, (1982)
 
 

Presidential elections in the United States
United States presidential history
firsts, presidential candidate
United States Presidential candidates